Jørgen Müller (1648-1695) was a Dano-Norwegian government official.  He served as the County Governor of Nedenæs county from 1681 until 1691. He was born in Copenhagen, Denmark in 1648 to Henrik Müller and Sophie Hansdatter. In 1682, he married Karen Henningsdatter Pogwisch, the daughter of Henning Pogwisch.

References

1648 births
1695 deaths
County governors of Norway